Philip Gilbert (March 29, 1931 – January 6, 2004) was a Canadian actor.

Background
Gilbert was born in Vancouver, British Columbia and educated at Vancouver College. He was a player with the Rank Organisation, appearing in many films during the 1950s and 1960s.

TV work
Despite his many film roles he was perhaps best known for his role as TIM in the original version of The Tomorrow People from 1973 to 1979. Gilbert returned to play TIM in 2001 for the audio plays produced by Big Finish and continued the role until his death in 2004, starting with The New Gods up to and including The Power of Fear.

He had a broad stage career, starring in such productions as Divorce Me, Darling! in the West End, as well as appearing many times at the Prince Regent Theatre, Farnborough, where he was Head of Drama.

He was represented by Nicholas Young's theatrical agency.

TV and filmography

 Simon and Laura (1955) - Joe
 The Adventures of Quentin Durward (1955) - Louis' Messenger (uncredited)
 Man of the Moment (1955) - Pilot (uncredited)
 Reach for the Sky (1956) - Canadian Pilot / Coltishall II (uncredited)
 Checkpoint (1956) - Eddie
 Account Rendered (1957) - John Langford
 Rock You Sinners (1957) - Johnny Laurence
 Bachelor of Hearts (1958) - Conrad Lewis
 Dentist in the Chair (1960) - young man in the surgery
 The Singer Not the Song (1961) - Phil Brown
 No Love for Johnnie (1961) - Terry Langham (uncredited)
 The Avengers (1961, TV Series) - Jeremy de Willoughby
 Dentist on the Job (1961) - Floor Manager
 Studio Four (1962, TV Series) - Captain
 The Human Jungle (1963, TV Series) - David Branch
 Die! Die! My Darling! (1965) (aka FANATIC) - Oscar
 The Frozen Dead (1966) - Dr Ted Roberts
 George and the Dragon (1966, TV Series) - TV Actor
 Some Girls Do (1969) - Test Co-Pilot (uncredited)
 Sykes: With the Lid Off (guest star for Thames TV broadcast 7 July 1971, TV Movie)
 Till Death Us Do Part (1972) - Golfer
 The Tomorrow People (1973-1979, TV Series) - TIM / Timus / Tikno / the voice of Galactic Federation Biotronic Computers
 Mister Big (broadcast BBC One, 7 January - 11 February 1977 and 30 June - 4 August 1977)
 Citizen Smith (1977, TV Series) - Hotel Manager
 Sherlock Holmes and Doctor Watson (1980, TV Series) - Mr. Brighton
 Superman III (1983) - Newsreader
 Howards' Way (1985, TV Series) - Derek Fielding (final appearance)

Theatre
Gilbert played "Blue" in Share My Lettuce - at the Lyric Theatre, Hammersmith from 21 August 1957 and at the Comedy Theatre from 25 September 1957 - 17 May 1958.

References

External links

1931 births
2004 deaths
Canadian male stage actors
Canadian male film actors
Canadian male television actors
Male actors from Vancouver